Doc Martin is a British television medical comedy drama series starring Martin Clunes in the title role of Doctor Martin Ellingham. It was created by Dominic Minghella after the character of Dr Martin Bamford in the 2000 comedy film Saving Grace. The show is set in the fictional seaside village of Portwenn and filmed on location in the village of Port Isaac, Cornwall, England, with most interior scenes shot in a converted local barn.

Doc Martin first aired on ITV on 2 September 2004, with a first series of six episodes. The episode number for the second series increased to eight. This was followed by a TV film and a third series of seven episodes. The next six series aired eight episodes each. Throughout the series, the various characters almost never refer to him as "Doctor Ellingham".  Patients and some of his acquaintances  usually just call him "Doc", and everyone else calls him Martin.

While it had been reported in 2017 that the series would end after Series 9 in 2019, Martin Clunes clarified that it had only been commissioned as far as that year, thereby not ruling out future plans by the broadcaster.  Immediately after airing the finale episode of Series 9, ITV issued a terse publicity statement, "Goodbye, Doc! We'll miss you." However, in April 2020, Director Nigel Cole confirmed that there will be a 10th series (See main article on Doc Martin). 

 This total counts the TV film as 1 episode.

The tenth series of Doc Martin aired in 2022 and is the final series.

Series overview

Episodes

Series 1 (2004)

Series 2 (2005–2006)

TV film (2006)

American PBS affiliates broadcast this in Part 1 and Part 2 episodes. In the Acorn Media compilation, "On the Edge" is included in the series 2 DVD, as part of that series' episodes.

Series 3 (2007)

Series 4 (2009)

Series 5 (2011)

Series 6 (2013)

Series 7 (2015)

Series 8 (2017)

Series 9 (2019)

Series 10 (2022)

Title= Farewell Doc Martin

Home media

References

External links

 Doc Martin Episodes on British Comedy Guide
 
 

Doc Martin
Doc Martin